The Welsh Championships  (Welsh: Pencampwriaethau Cymru)  its original name until 1970 was also known as the Championship of Wales (1951), the Welsh Open (Welsh: Cymraeg Agored) (1947–50) the Greenshields Welsh Championships and Greenshields Welsh Open (1970–74) for sponsorship  reasons was an outdoor tennis event held from 1886 through 1974 it was played at various locations throughout its duration including Cardiff, Newport and Penarth in Wales. The dates that the tournament was held varied between June and July annually.

History
The Welsh Championships tournament began in 1886. It was originally held at the Penarth Lawn Tennis club, in Penarth, Vale of Glamorgan through the later part of the nineteenth century and the first decade of the twentieth, the last event being held there in 1909. The championships was staged only once during this time in Cardiff, in 1891, before it became a permanent fixture at the Newport Athletic Club from 1946 onward  which  also the hosted the 1906 International Lawn Tennis Challenge final later known as the Davis Cup. The tournament featured both men's and women's singles competition as well as same sex and mixed doubles. The first non-British men's singles final took place in 1922 between Manuel Alonso and Eduardo Flaquer of Spain and this was followed by the first non-British ladies singles final in 1932 between Jadwiga Jędrzejowska of Poland and Marie-Louise Horn of Germany. Many former Grand Slam champions have played and won this tournament and it survived for a period of 88 years until 1974.

Champions

Men's singles

Women's singles

See also
Tennis Wales

Notes

References
 Dunlop Lawn Tennis Almanack and Tournament Guide, G.P. Hughes, 1939 to 1958, Published by Dunlop Sports Co. Ltd, UK.
 Lawn Tennis and Badminton Magazines, 1896–1901, Amateur Sports Publishing Co. Ltd, London, UK.
 Lowe's Lawn Tennis Annuals and Compendia, Lowe, Sir F. Gordon, Eyre & Spottiswoode, London, UK.

External links
 The Tennis Base:Welsh Championships-Roll of Honor

Defunct tennis tournaments in the United Kingdom
Grass court tennis tournaments
Tennis tournaments in Wales